The 2016–2017 UCI Cyclo-cross World Cup – also known as the Telenet UCI Cyclo-cross World Cup for sponsorship reasons – was a season long cyclo-cross competition, organised by the Union Cycliste Internationale (UCI). The competition took place between 21 September 2016 and 22 January 2017, over a total of nine events. The defending champions were Wout van Aert in the men's competition and Sanne Cant in the women's competition.

Van Aert was able to defend his World Cup title with a round to spare, not finishing any lower than second in the seven races – four wins and three second-place finishes – prior to his crowning. His main rival Mathieu van der Poel was the only other rider to take victories prior to the title being won, taking three straight wins during the season, but he missed several meetings, including the Memorial Romano Scotti in Rome, which allowed van Aert to take the title.

With six different winners in as many races, the women's competition proved competitive. After a win at CrossVegas, Dutch rider Sophie de Boer held the leaders' jersey and despite Katie Compton taking the jersey after the following round at the Jingle Cross, de Boer was able to regain the jersey with consistent finishing. Over the next five races – despite not winning any races – de Boer achieved finishes of second, fourth, third and sixth, and with Cant missing the round in Rome, another third-place finish gave de Boer her first Cyclo-cross World Cup title.

Points distribution
Points were awarded to all eligible riders each race. The top ten finishers received points according to the following table:

Riders finishing in positions 11 to 50 also received points, going down from 40 points for 11th place by one point per place to 1 point for 50th place.

Events
In comparison to last season's seven races, this season was scheduled to have nine. Lignières-en-Berry was taken out of the programme – while Rome (Fiuggi), Iowa and Zeven were added.

Final individual standings

Men

Women

Notes

References

World Cup
World Cup
UCI Cyclo-cross World Cup